Serenity Forge is an American video game developer and publisher based in Boulder, Colorado. The studio was founded in 2014 by Zhenghua "Z" Yang.

History 
Upon graduating from the University of Colorado Boulder's Leeds School of Business in 2014, Zhenghua Yang (commonly referred to as Z) formally founded Serenity Forge in Boulder, Colorado, with the mission to "create meaningful games that challenge the way players think," according to the company's official website. Despite his academic background in finance and economics, Yang, a lifelong gamer, decided to pursue a career in video games because he saw more potential and fulfillment in the medium. Prior to graduating college, Yang (under the Serenity Forge brand) released the studio's debut game Loving Life in 2012. Loving Life released for free on online platforms and serves as an autobiographical visual novel detailing Yang's personal experience coping with chronic refractory idiopathic thrombocytopenic purpura, a rare autoimmune disease that saw him hospitalized for over two years as a teenager.

In 2016, Serenity Forge began publishing games by third-party developers in addition to making its own. The Studio's first publishing releases were Stage 2 Studios' science fiction exploration game Lifeless Planet and developer Ludo Land's narrative puzzle game Four Sided Fantasy. As a publisher, Serenity Forge looked to satisfy what it considered a lack of thoughtful, story-driven games.

Games

References

External links 
 

2014 establishments in Colorado
American companies established in 2014
Boulder, Colorado
Companies based in Boulder, Colorado
Software companies based in Colorado
Video game companies established in 2014
Video game companies of the United States
Video game development companies